is a Japanese footballer currently playing as a defender for Machida Zelvia.

Club career
Narasaka made his professional debut in a 0–2 Emperor's Cup loss against Tochigi SC.

Career statistics

Club
.

Notes

References

External links

2002 births
Living people
Japanese footballers
Association football defenders
J2 League players
FC Machida Zelvia players